This is a list of Missouri Western Griffons football players in the NFL Draft.

Key

Selections

References

Lists of National Football League draftees by college football team

Missouri Western Griffons NFL Draft